Amit Dolawat is an Indian actor who works in television. He has also performed in a music video and a short film "Pita", also in the Music Video: Akhir Tumhein Aana Hai- Remix from Album: In search of Mirage by DJ Mohit.

Personal life

Dolawat married his long-time girlfriend, Cheshta Sharma, on February 14, 2017.

Television

References

External links
 

Indian male television actors
Living people
21st-century Indian male actors
Place of birth missing (living people)
Year of birth missing (living people)
Actors from Mumbai